Sturm & Drang Tour 2002 is a live DVD documenting KMFDM's Sturm & Drang Tour of 2002 in support of the album Attak. It was the first tour after the band reunited following a 1999 split.

Track listing
 "D.I.Y." 
 "Attak/Reload" 
 "Dirty" 
 "Ultra" 
 "Boots" 
 "Yohoho" 
 "Rules (ft. Chris Connelly)"
 "Find it Fuck it Forget it" 
 "Sturm & Drang"
 "Megalomaniac" 
 "Flesh" 
 "Wrath" 
 "Godlike (ft. Mark Durante)"
 "Spit Sperm"

Personnel
Raymond Watts – vocals, guitars
Sascha Konietzko – vocals, percussion, samplers, synthesizers
Lucia Cifarelli – vocals, ninja-sidstation
Steve White - guitars
Jules Hodgson – guitars
Bill Rieflin – bass
Andy Selway – drums

Guest appearances
Chris Connelly - vocals
Mark Durante - guitars

KMFDM video albums
2002 video albums
Live video albums
2002 live albums
Wax Trax! Records video albums